KMZU (100.7 FM) is a radio station broadcasting a country music format. Licensed to Carrollton, Missouri, United States.  The station is currently owned by Miles Carter, through licensee Carter Media LLC.

On September 8, 1990, KMZU swapped frequencies with KCFX. At that time, KMZU moved from 101.1 to 100.7 FM.

External links

MZU
Radio stations in the Kansas City metropolitan area
Country radio stations in the United States